Przemysław Szkatuła (born 19 November 1992) is a Polish professional footballer who plays as a midfielder for III liga club Pniówek Pawłowice.

Career
Szkatuła began his career at Odra Wodzisław Śląski. On 17 March 2012, he made his debut in professional football as a part of the Polonia Bytom squad. After 2012–13 season, his contract was terminated by Polish Football Association. On 30 August 2013, Szkatuła signed one-year deal with II liga club Rozwój Katowice. He left Rozwój at the end of the 2014–15 season, having made 46 appearances for the club.

In August 2015, Szkatuła moved to Karpaty Krosno. After one-and-a-half seasons with Karpaty, he joined Polonia Bytom in February 2017, where he played until the end of the 2016–17 season.

On 4 July 2017, Szkatuła signed for III liga club Motor Lublin. On 2 August 2018, he joined IV liga side Polonia Bytom. On 1 February 2019, he signed one-and-a-year contract with ROW 1964 Rybnik

References

External links
 

1992 births
Living people
Polish footballers
People from Wodzisław Śląski
Polonia Bytom players
Rozwój Katowice players
Karpaty Krosno players
Motor Lublin players
KS ROW 1964 Rybnik players
Ruch Chorzów players
Odra Wodzisław Śląski players
I liga players
II liga players
III liga players
Association football midfielders